Dun Telve is an iron-age broch located about  southeast of the village of Glenelg, Inverness-shire in the Highland Region of Scotland. It is one of the best preserved brochs in Scotland.

Location
Dun Telve stands on the north bank of the Abhainn a’ Ghlinne Bhig, in the lower reaches of Gleann Beag. It lies next to the minor road which leads south from Glenelg.

History
It is thought that the broch was robbed for stone in 1722 (probably for the building of Bernera Barracks in Glenelg). Dun Telve was popular with tourists by the late 18th century, and was first sketched in the late 18th century. It was surveyed in detail in 1871–1873 by Henry Dryden. The building was brought into state care between 1882 and 1901 and the boundary markers that define the area of guardianship are still visible. Around 1914 a programme of works was undertaken by the Office of Works which included "clearing out" the interior, inserting concrete into the upper intramural space and pointing the internal wall-face. The broch has never been archaeologically excavated. The broch is now in the care of Historic Environment Scotland.

Description

The entrance is on the west but it has been modified, probably in the mid-19th century. On the south side of the entrance passage is a small side-chamber, sometimes called a "guard cell".
A doorway on the north side of the interior of the broch provides access first to an internal cell and then to the intramural space that narrows as it rises through to the top of the surviving wall. Access up the tower is by a winding stone stair, and openings at intervals once gave access to the upper floors. The presence of two horizontal stone ledges, or scarcements, up the height of the surviving section suggests that there were two upper floors.

Structures appended to the west and northwest sides of Dun Telve include at least one rectangular building.

References

External links

Glenelg Brochs: Dun Telve And Dun Troddan, Historic Scotland

Archaeological sites in Highland (council area)
Brochs
Historic Environment Scotland properties
Scheduled monuments in Scotland